Riflessi di luce (also known in English-speaking countries as Reflections of Light) is a 1988 Italian erotic movie directed by Mario Bianchi and starring Pamela Prati.

Plot
Sick after an accident in which he lost his wife, a musician is angry with the whole world. In a secluded villa where a bisexual, a lesbian, and a spoiled kid live the dramatic and lustful affair plays out.

Cast
 Pamela Prati  as Pamela	
 Gabriele Tinti  as Federico Brandi	
 Loredana Romito  as Giorgia
 Gabriele Gori  as Marcello Prandi
 Jessica Moore  as Gaia
 Laura Gemser  as Chiara

See also    
 List of Italian films of 1988

References

External links

1980 films
Italian erotic drama films
1980s erotic drama films
1980 drama films
1988 drama films
1988 films
1980s Italian-language films
1980s Italian films